Tolton may refer to:

People:
Augustine Tolton or Augustus Tolton (1854–1897),  the first black Roman Catholic priest in the United States
Edwin Tolton (1856–1917), a farmer, grain merchant and political figure in Ontario, Canada

Other:
Father Tolton Regional Catholic High School, a high school Columbia, Missouri
Edward Tolton House, a property on the National Register of Historic Places in Beaver County, Utah, United States 
Tolton Center, an adult education outreach program that is part of the De La Salle Institute in Chicago, Illinois, United States